The 2008 Men's World Floorball Championships were the seventh men's Floorball World Championships. The tournament was held from 6 to 14 December 2008. The tournament took place in the cities of Prague and Ostrava. All group stage matches were played in Ostrava's ČEZ Aréna, and all playoff matches were played in Prague's O2 Arena, with the exception of the 9th place match, which was played in Prague's Sparta Arena.

Finland won its first championship by defeating Sweden in overtime in the gold medal game, breaking Sweden's row of six championship victories. This was also the first-ever lost game for the Swedish team in world championships.

Championship schedule

Preliminary round

Group A

Group B

Playoffs

Semi-finals

Bronze medal match

Championship match

Placement round

9th place match

7th place match

5th place match

External links 
Official Website

Mens World Floorball Championships, 2008
Floorball World Championships
International floorball competitions hosted by the Czech Republic
2008 in Czech sport
Sports competitions in Prague
Sport in Ostrava
December 2008 sports events in Europe
2000s in Prague